Altica ignita, the strawberry flea beetle, is a species of flea beetle in the family Chrysomelidae. It is found in North America.

References

Further reading

 
 

Alticini
Articles created by Qbugbot
Beetles described in 1807
Beetles of North America
Taxa named by Johann Karl Wilhelm Illiger